Niemirówka may refer to:

Places

Moldova

Poland
Niemirówka, Poland, a rural hamlet in Lubelskie Voivodeship.
Because of Polish morphology, certain declensions of the Polish villages of Niemirówek and Niemirówek-Kolonia, which are also located in Lubelskie Voivodeship, are written as Niemirówka.

Ukraine
Niemirówka is also the Polish form of Немирівка (Nemyrivka), the name of three villages in the historical region of Volhynia in Ukraine. These settlements were formerly part of the Polish-Lithuanian Commonwealth and within the Pale of Settlement:

Nemyrivka, Rivne Oblast
Nemyrivka, Zhytomir Oblast
Nemyrivka, Khmelnytsky Oblast

Russia
Niemirówka is also the Polish form of Немирoвка (Nemirovka), the name of a village in the Kormilovsky District of Siberia. Many Poles and Ukrainians were forcibly settled in this area during the Russian Empire and the USSR. Siberian Ukrainians ("Sibirskye Ukraintsy"), ("Sybirsʹki Ukrayintsy") form a national minority in Siberia and the Russian Far East, but make up the majority in some of the region's cities.